Momuy is a commune in the Landes department in Nouvelle-Aquitaine in south-western France. The journalist and writer Pierre Veilletet (1943–2013) was born in Momuy.

See also
Communes of the Landes department

References

Communes of Landes (department)